Detlev Frederick Vagts (February 13, 1929 – August 20, 2013) was an American legal scholar. He was a professor of international law at Harvard Law School.

Vagts was born in Washington, DC, to German Alfred Vagts and Miriam Beard, daughter of Charles A. Beard. He studied at Harvard College and later Harvard Law School, where he graduated Juris Doctor in 1951. After practicing at Cahill Gordon & Reindel for eight years—interrupted by service in the Judge Advocate General's Corps—Vagts joined faculty at his alma mater, receiving tenure in 1962. In 1984, having been the Eli Goldston Professor of Law for four years, Detlev Vagts was appointed Bemis Professor of International Law, succeeding Louis B. Sohn.

References 

1929 births
2013 deaths
20th-century American lawyers
Harvard Law School alumni
Harvard Law School faculty
People associated with Cahill Gordon & Reindel
American Journal of International Law editors